Stanley McMeekan (7 March 1925 – 6 October 1971) was a British basketball player. He competed in the men's tournament at the 1948 Summer Olympics. His twin brother, Sydney, also competed in the same tournament.

References

1925 births
1971 deaths
British men's basketball players
Olympic basketball players of Great Britain
Basketball players at the 1948 Summer Olympics
Sportspeople from Birmingham, West Midlands
Twin sportspeople
English twins